Brady Peak is an -elevation summit located in the Grand Canyon, in Coconino County of northern Arizona, United States. Its nearest higher neighbor is Mount Hayden,  to the north, Kibbey Butte is one mile to northwest, and Alsap Butte lies one mile to the northeast. Brady Peak is named after Peter Rainsford Brady (1825–1902), a pioneer and politician of the Arizona Territory. This geographical feature's name was officially adopted in 1932 by the U.S. Board on Geographic Names. According to the Köppen climate classification system, Brady Peak is located in a cold semi-arid climate zone.

Geology

The summit spire of Brady Peak is composed of cream-colored Permian Coconino Sandstone. This sandstone, which is the third-youngest of the strata in the Grand Canyon, was deposited 265 million years ago as sand dunes. Below this Coconino Sandstone is reddish, slope-forming, Permian Hermit Formation, which in turn overlays the Pennsylvanian-Permian Supai Group. Precipitation runoff from this feature drains east into the Colorado River via Nankoweap Creek.

See also
 Geology of the Grand Canyon area
 Siegfried Pyre
 Tritle Peak
 Saddle Mountain

References

External links 

 Weather forecast: National Weather Service
 Brady Peak rock climbing: Mountainproject.com

Grand Canyon, North Rim
Grand Canyon
Landforms of Coconino County, Arizona
Mountains of Arizona
Mountains of Coconino County, Arizona
North American 2000 m summits
Colorado Plateau
Grand Canyon National Park
Sandstone formations of the United States